Ileto is a surname. Notable people with the surname include:

 Rafael Ileto (1920–2003), general in the Philippine Army
 Reynaldo Ileto (born 1946), Filipino historian